Ron Stanley Mark (born 29 January 1954) is a New Zealand politician of the New Zealand First party, and former soldier, who served as Minister of Defence between October 2017 and November 2020. He served as mayor of Carterton from 2010 to 2014, and again from 2022 defeating incumbent Greg Lang.

Early life and family
Mark was born in Masterton on 29 January 1954, the son of Apiti Stanley Maaka and Te Aroha Maaka (née Grace). He was fostered with six Pākehā foster families in Pahiatua, saying "I wouldn’t have survived without them". He was educated at Tararua College from 1968 to 1970. Mark was married to Gail Ann Berry, and the couple had four children. One of Mark's cousins is Marama Fox, formerly a Māori Party MP.

Mark pursued a military career between 1971 and 1990. Mark initially served in the New Zealand Army. His first unit was the Royal New Zealand Electrical and Mechanical Engineers before moving to 2/1 Battalion, 3 and 10 Tpt Regiments and Queen Alexandra's Mounted Rifles before passing New Zealand Special Air Service selection. Mark served a 13-month tour of duty in the Sinai with the Multinational Force and Observers in 1982–83. After being refused entry into the NZSAS, he was contracted to the Sultanate of Oman as a technical staff officer from 1985 to 1986, and then joined the Sultan of Oman's Armed Forces becoming an electrical and mechanical engineering officer in the Sultan's Special Force Electrical and Mechanical Engineers between 1986 and 1990.

Between 1990 and 1996, Mark was a commercial consultant, ran an import and export business, and was an amusement park operator.

Political career

Member of Parliament, 1996–2008

In the 1993 election he was the Labour candidate for the Selwyn electorate. He was later involved in the discussions about the formation of the New Zealand Democratic Coalition.
When these failed, he joined New Zealand First.
He was a list MP from the 1996 election until his party's failure to retain any seats in the 2008 election. During the (1996–98) coalition between New Zealand First and the National Party, he was the government's Senior Whip.

The New Zealand television channel TV3 was banned for three days from filming in Parliament in August 2006 for showing Mark repeatedly giving the finger to another MP.

In 2009, Mark told media that while he still had a subscription with New Zealand First, he was "not active", and that he would not rule out standing for Parliament with another party.

Mayor of Carterton
In 2010, Mark was elected Mayor of Carterton in the Wairarapa. He succeeded outspoken mayor Gary McPhee who retired after two terms. In the 2013 local elections, Mark was returned as mayor unopposed.

Return to politics, 2014–2020
Mark stood as a New Zealand First candidate at the 2014 general election, finishing third in the Wairarapa electorate. However, his ninth placing on the New Zealand First list saw him returned to Parliament, and he resigned as Mayor of Carterton, and was replaced by John Booth.

When the new Parliament was sworn in on 20 October 2014, Mark was one of two MPs nominated for the position of Speaker of the House of Representatives. He received 13 votes, coming second to incumbent Speaker David Carter. 

On 3 July 2015, he replaced Tracey Martin as deputy leader of New Zealand First.

However, he was re-elected into Parliament on New Zealand First's party list.

Following the 2017 general election, Mark was appointed Minister of Defence and Veterans following the formation of a coalition government consisting of the Labour Party, New Zealand First, and the Green Party. Mark was succeeded as New Zealand First deputy leader by Fletcher Tabuteau on 27 February 2018.

During the 2020 general election held on 17 October, Mark contested the Wairarapa electorate, coming third place behind Labour's candidate Kieran McAnulty and National's candidate Mike Butterick. He and his fellow NZ First MPs lost their seats after the party's vote dropped to 2.6%, below the five percent threshold needed to enter Parliament.

On 9 November 2020, Mark was granted retention of the title "The Honourable" for life, in recognition of his term as a member of the Executive Council.

After politics, 2020–present

Mark and other former New Zealand First MPs were approached by the media ahead of the party's AGM in June 2021. He said that he would not be attending the meeting or renewing his party membership, as he was finished with politics and not interested in returning to Parliament. Mark travelled to Ukraine to assist with humanitarian efforts during the 2022 Russian invasion of Ukraine.

Mark was re-elected as Mayor of Carterton in the 2022 New Zealand local elections. He ran on a campaign for more scrutiny of council operations to avoid previous "cost blowouts", also drawing attention to what he described as "some political parties...pushing for central control over everything, whether by asset stripping first or imposing more and more legislative requirements". He later clarified his concerns that this was [an]..."ideological drive to centralise and put everything under the control of the government", citing the Three Waters reform programme as an example of this "collectivism". Mark also expressed some concerns about the voting process due to high numbers of  people not receiving their voting papers, or votes going missing in the mail, stating that "constitutionally...[this]...is open to questioning by every court of law."

References

|-

1954 births
Living people
New Zealand First MPs
New Zealand Army personnel
Māori MPs
Māori mayors
Ngāti Kahungunu people
Military of Oman
Mayors of Carterton, New Zealand
New Zealand Labour Party politicians
New Zealand list MPs
New Zealand Māori soldiers
People educated at Tararua College
Members of the New Zealand House of Representatives
Unsuccessful candidates in the 1993 New Zealand general election
Unsuccessful candidates in the 2008 New Zealand general election
People from Masterton
21st-century New Zealand politicians
Candidates in the 2017 New Zealand general election
New Zealand defence ministers
Members of the Cabinet of New Zealand
Unsuccessful candidates in the 2020 New Zealand general election